Anthony Joseph Daniher (born 21 January 1963) is a former Australian rules footballer who played with the South Melbourne/Sydney and Essendon Football Clubs in the Australian Football League (AFL). Anthony's brothers, Terry, Neale and Chris, also played for Essendon in the AFL. Anthony is currently the owner of Danihers Facility Management, a facility management business with offices in Melbourne, Brisbane and Sydney. He is the father of Joe Daniher.

Early life and childhood
Anthony was born the fourth child of James "Jim" Daniher and Edna Daniher (née Erwin) on 21 January 1963 at West Wyalong Base Hospital. Anthony attended St Joseph's Catholic School, Ungarie for his primary education before going to Ungarie Central School until he finished year ten, after which he went to TAFE in Wagga Wagga.

It was during his childhood that Anthony showed his love for sport, namely Australian rules football, playing in the Northern Riverina Football League (NRFL) on Saturdays while playing rugby league at school carnivals. It was during his time in the NRFL that Anthony won several best & fairest awards before he moved to Wagga Wagga for TAFE, where he would play for Turvey Park in the South West Football League (New South Wales). It was in 1980 that both the South Melbourne and Essendon Football Clubs approached Anthony for his signature. Anthony eventually decided to play for South Melbourne, who were in the process of relocating to Sydney at the time.

VFL/AFL career
From 1981-1994 Anthony played for South Melbourne/Sydney and Essendon in the VFL/AFL, playing 233 games and playing in the 1990 Grand Final with Essendon, which they lost to Collingwood. He also made history alongside his brothers when they became the first quartet of brothers to play for the same team in a State of Origin match and in a home-and-away game. It was after the 1994 season that Anthony retired as the last remaining player in the AFL to have played for South Melbourne.

Retirement and beyond
It was during his footy career that Anthony, Terry and Chris formed Daniher Property Services, a cleaning company based in Melbourne. After Terry and Chris left the business, Anthony became the owner of the company, now named Danihers Facility Management.

Anthony's son, Joe, was picked up by Essendon in 2012 under the father-son rule and made his debut for the Bombers on Friday 7 June 2013.

See also 
List of Australian rules football families

Further reading
 Daniher, Terry Neale Daniher, Anthony Daniher, and Chris Daniher. The Danihers: The Story of Football's Favourite Family. Sydney: Allen & Unwin, 2009.

References

External links

1963 births
Living people
Australian rules footballers from New South Wales
Sydney Swans players
Essendon Football Club players
All-Australians (AFL)
New South Wales Australian rules football State of Origin players